Peter Mlynár (born March 1, 1988, in Poprad) is a Slovak cross-country skier who has been competing since 2007. At the 2010 Winter Olympics in Vancouver, he finished 12th in the 4 x 10 km relay and 57th in the individual sprint event.

Mlynár's best World Cup finish was 17th in a 4 x 10 km event in Norway in 2009, while his best individual finish was 47th in an individual sprint event in Finland that same year.

References

1988 births
Cross-country skiers at the 2010 Winter Olympics
Cross-country skiers at the 2014 Winter Olympics
Cross-country skiers at the 2018 Winter Olympics
Cross-country skiers at the 2022 Winter Olympics
Living people
Olympic cross-country skiers of Slovakia
Slovak male cross-country skiers
Sportspeople from Poprad
Universiade gold medalists for Slovakia
Universiade medalists in cross-country skiing
Competitors at the 2011 Winter Universiade